Mottisfont & Dunbridge railway station serves the village of Dunbridge in Hampshire, England. It is the closest station to Mottisfont Abbey and the village of Mottisfont, and was renamed Mottisfont & Dunbridge in 2006 to reflect this, having been previously known simply as Dunbridge. Mottisfont previously had a station of its own on the Andover to Romsey line, known as the Sprat and Winkle Line, but this closed on 7 September 1964 under the Beeching Axe.

Since 9 December 2007, a new service has served Mottisfont & Dunbridge. It runs from Salisbury to Southampton Central, via Romsey. South Western Railway operates the service using two-car Class 158 units. In consequence, Mottisfont & Dunbridge now has a roughly hourly service, a great improvement over the previous frequency.  As a result of this, Great Western Railway no longer serves the station, although it continued to manage the station, and the station still carried First Great Western branding. In April 2020, the management of the station was transferred to South Western Railway.

The station is one of 20 covered by the Three Rivers Community Rail partnership.

According to station usage statistics, Mottisfont & Dunbridge is the second least frequently used station in Hampshire, with only Beaulieu Road having fewer passengers.

Services
The station is managed by South Western Railway, which runs an hourly service between Romsey and Salisbury via .  This also runs on Sundays, at a two-hourly frequency.

References

External links

Local Rail Information from the  Three Rivers Community Rail partnership

Railway stations in Hampshire
Former London and South Western Railway stations
Railway stations in Great Britain opened in 1847
Railway stations served by South Western Railway
1847 establishments in England